Universal Radio is the debut album by New Zealand group Dragon released in June 1974 on Vertigo Records and produced by Rick Shadwell. Universal Radio, along with their second album Scented Gardens for the Blind are in the progressive rock genre—all subsequent albums are hard rock/pop rock.

On 2 July 2009, Aztec Music reissued Universal Radio with extensive liner notes, rare photos, and three bonus tracks. The first bonus track is a live recording from 1974 of their cover version of Fleetwood Mac's "Black Magic Woman", while the last two, "X-Ray Creature" and "Dinghy Days" are the A-side and B-side of Marc Hunter's first solo single released in 1973.

Track listing

1974 Vertigo
Side 1
"Universal Radio" (Goodwin, M. Hunter, Thompson, Storey, T. Hunter) - 8:33
"Going Slow" (T Hunter) - 6:16
"Patina" (Goodwin, (Break Dragon)) - 11:47
Side 2
"Weetbix" (Goodwin, T Hunter, Bedgegood, Abbot) - 2:55
"Graves" (Goodwin, T Hunter, Reynolds, Thompson) - 6:56
"Avalanche" (Goodwin, T Hunter, Reynolds, Thompson) - 11:08

2009 Aztec Music Reissue
"Black Magic Woman" (Peter Green) - 6:38
"X-Ray Creature" (Graeme Collins, A Baysting) - 3:06
"Dinghy Days" (T Hunter) - 3:33

Note: On all releases tracks 4–6 segue to become one long track but are separated into three.

Liner Notes

1974 Vertigo
Universal Radio was recorded at Stebbings Studio, Auckland (late February 1974)
Produced by Rick Shadwell
Engineered by Tony Moan

"X-Ray Creature" b/w "Dinghy Days" was recorded at Mascot Recording Studios, Auckland (May 1973)
Engineered by Gary Potts

Dragon:
Ivan Thompson: Organ, Piano, Moog
Ray Goodwin - Guitars, Vocal
Marc Hunter - Vocal, Percussion
Neil Storey - Drums
Todd Hunter - Bass, Vocal

Dragon thanks
Paul Crowther for Moog
Tony for Fender Rhodes
All songs by Dragon
Liner and Cover Art by Dick Frizzell

2009 Aztec Music Reissue

Additional musicians
Graeme Collins - piano on "X-Ray Creature" (Collins was a founding member of Dragon but had left before Universal Radio was recorded)
Herb Mann - lead guitar on "Dinghy Days"

References

General

External links
 Dragon at Bruce Sergent's website: New Zealand Music of the 60's, 70's and a bit of 80's.

1974 debut albums
Dragon (band) albums